Kurt Werth (September 21, 1896 – August 25, 1983) was a German-born illustrator best known for American children's books.

Werth was born September 21, 1896, in Leipzig, Germany.  He studied at the Hochschule für Grafik und Buchkunst Leipzig  in Leipzig beginning in 1913.  He studied there for two years before being drafted into the German army.  After his two years of service he returned to the Academy. His professor was influenced by Cézanne, although the public wasn't yet aware of the new trend of cubism in art. At the Academy, Werth studied the new graphic techniques and tried them out as illustrations of literary works. After graduating, Werth began to illustrate books, the first being Shakespeare's Troilus and Cressida which was well received.

Werth moved to Munich, Germany after graduating, to draw satirical cartoons for various Munich magazines.  In 1928, he and his wife Margaret, a Jewish German, moved to Berlin, Germany so that she could become part of the City Theater. In Berlin, Werth continued to draw satirical cartoons for Berlin magazines.

With Hitler's increasing power, the magazines folded, and Margaret Werth, who was Jewish, was not allowed to work. In the 1939 the Werths emigrated to the United States where Werth found employment illustrating a Sunday column in the New York Times magazine.

Werth began drawing political cartoons for a wide number of U.S. magazines with a political bent once the U.S. became involved in World War II.  After the war Werth began to illustrate children's books.  One of his first attempts was Rosalys Hall's The Merry Miller.  This attempt led to many other offers for illustrating work.

Werth became a United States citizen in 1947.

Werth states, "As a German I was certainly influenced by the tradition of exact and thorough training in drawing. This goes back to Dürer and even farther." He attempts to illustrate children's books in a "modern style". "Books have to be illustrated in our times. They should show the style of our times. Not all of them do it."

Kurt Werth died in New York City on August 25, 1983.

Awards 
Lewis Carroll Shelf Award in 1969 for McBroom Tells the Truth by Sid Fleischman
Golden Kite Award in 1973 for McBroom the Rainmaker by Sid Fleischman,
New Jersey Institute of Technology Award in 1971 for That Jefferson Boy.

Illustrated books 

 No Ducks For Dinner; story by Rosalys Hall. 1953
 Once the Mullah; Persian folk tales retold by Alice Geer Kelsey. 1954
 One Mitten Lewis; by Helen Kay, pseud. 1955
 The story of San Francisco; by Charlotte E Cobden Jackson. 1955
 An Elephant in the Family by James Playsted Wood; 1957
 Danger in the Everglades by Frederick W. Keith. 1957
 The year without a Santa Claus. by Phyllis McGinley. 1957
 The thing at the foot of the bed and other scary tales. by Maria Leach. 1959
 Stop It, Moppit! by Geraldine Ross, 1959
 Noodles, nitwits, and numskulls by Maria Leach. 1961
 Tony's birds. by Millicent Selsam. 1961
 A tiger called Thomas. by Charlotte Zolotow. 1963
 Hear ye of Boston. by Polly Curren. 1964
 The luck book. by Maria Leach. 1964
 The valiant tailor, by Kurt Werth. 1965
 Sailor Tom, by Edna Boutwell. 1966
 The legends of Paul Bunyan. by Roberta Strauss Feuerlicht. 1966
 McBroom tells the truth, by Sid Fleischman. 1966
 McBroom and the big wind, by Sid Fleischman. 1967
 The monkey, the lion, and the snake, by Kurt Werth. 1967
 King Thrushbeard. by Kurt Werth. 1968
 That Lincoln boy. by Earl Schenck Miers. 1968
 One dark night. by Edna Mitchell Preston. 1969
 McBroom's Ear, by Sid Fleischman; Kurt Werth. 1969
 Lazy Jack. by Kurt Werth. 1970
 Samuel Clemens. by Charles Michael Daugherty. 1970
 How a piglet crashed the Christmas party, by Boris Vladimirovich Zakhoder. 1971
 McBroom's zoo, by Sid Fleischman. 1972
 Herbert's stilts, by Hazel Hutchins Wilson. 1972
 McBroom the rainmaker, by Sid Fleischman. 1973
Molly and the giant, by Kurt Werth; Mabel Watts. 1973
Dick Whittington and His Cat. by Eva Moore. 1974
The three beggar kings. by Rosalys Haskell Hall. 1974
The newcomers; ten tales of American immigrants by Joseph Raskin; Edith Raskin. 1974

References

External links 

 

1896 births
1983 deaths
American children's book illustrators
American children's writers
Artists from New York City
German children's book illustrators
German children's writers
German emigrants to the United States
German illustrators
German male writers
Artists from Leipzig
Hochschule für Grafik und Buchkunst Leipzig alumni
20th-century American male writers